Dmitri Leonidovich Makarov (born December 6, 1983) is a Russian professional ice hockey winger who is currently an unrestricted free agent. He most recently played for HC Yugra of the Kontinental Hockey League (KHL).

After his second year with Torpedo Nizhny Novgorod in the 2012–13 season,  Makarov was traded in the off-season to return to Salavat Yulaev in exchange for Denis Parshin and Sergei Sentyurin on May 5, 2013.

Career statistics

References

External links

1983 births
Living people
Metallurg Magnitogorsk players
HC Neftekhimik Nizhnekamsk players
Sportspeople from Ufa
Russian ice hockey centres
Salavat Yulaev Ufa players
Torpedo Nizhny Novgorod players
HC Yugra players
Zauralie Kurgan players